Segel, and its variants including Segal or Siegel, is a primarily an Ashkenazi Jewish family name.

It may refer to:

Arthur I. Segel, American economist
Binjamin W. Segel (1867–1931), author
Harold Segel (1930–2016), professor
Jason Segel (born 1980), actor 
Jonathan Segel (born 1963), composer
Joseph Segel (1931–2019), American businessman
Lee Segel (1932–2005), applied mathematician

See also
Chagall (disambiguation)
 Segal
 Siegel
Sigel (disambiguation)

Jewish surnames
Yiddish-language surnames